Shining Star may refer to:

Albums
Shining Star (Fish Leong album)
Shining Star (Jerry Garcia Band album)
Shining Star (Jump5 album)

Songs
"Shining Star" (Earth, Wind & Fire song)
"Shining Star" (INXS song)
"Shining Star" (Nami Tamaki song)
"Shining Star" (The Manhattans song)
"Shining Star", a song by Backstreet Boys from Black & Blue
"Shining Star", a song by Bebe Rexha from Expectations
"Shining Star", a song by Get Far
"Shining Star", a song by Inna from Party Never Ends
"Shining Star", a song by Misia from Kiss in the Sky
"Shining Star", a song by Rend Collective Experiment from Homemade Worship by Handmade People

Other media
 Shining Star (1969 film), Iranian film
The Shining Star, a MediaCorp Singapore drama serial
 The Shining Star (Anderson), and African-American newspaper published in Anderson, Indiana from 1922 to 1927
 "Shining Star" Chandrakanth, a character in the 2010 film Payanam

See also
 Shining Stars (disambiguation)